The Roland MC-09 "PhraseLab" is a Roland synthesizer, described as a Roland TB-303 emulator featuring an effects processor and a 4-part phrase sampler.

Features

The key features of the MC-09 are:

 Single DSP monosynth for bass (TB-303 emulator), lead and drums
 Pattern sequencer for up to two measures with 16 beat per measure resolution
 Four track audio looper, samples patterns or internal input as "phrases"
 Loop control function, allows sampling phrases with varying pitch or chopping and rearranging phrases
 Effect processor (exclusive with monosynth)
 Smartmedia storage
 MIDI in and out connections (but no MIDI thru)

References
 

MC-09 PDF Documentation Links:
 Roland MC-09 Owner's Manual
 Roland MC-09 MIDI Implementation

Other Links:
 Roland UK Corporation, Roland MC-09 PhraseLab site
 Roland US Corporation, Roland MC-09 PhraseLab site
 WAV to MC-09 specific sample to WAV conversion software download page
The Roland MC-09 PHRASE LAB is the most underrated electronic bassline of all time

MC-09
Grooveboxes